Bob Dalsemer (born 1943) is a square and contra dance writer and caller. He has called dances for more than 40 years and in more than 33 states, plus internationally in Canada, the Czech Republic, Britain, Belgium, Denmark and Russia. He wrote the book West Virginia Square Dances (CDSS, 1982) and Folk Dance Fun for Schools and Families (John C. Campbell Folk School, 1995). He has also compiled the cassette/book compilations Smoke On the Water: Square Dance Classics and When The Work's All Done: A Square Dance Party For Beginners and Old Hands.

Dalsemer was born and raised in Baltimore. He co-founded the Baltimore Folk Music Society.

He served as president of the Country Dance and Song Society from 1990 to 1996. He was honored with the society’s Lifetime Contribution Award in 2011. He also served as the Music and Dance Coordinator at the John C. Campbell Folk School for 22 years, retiring in April 2013.

See also
Callerlab, the International Association of Square Dance Callers
Square dance program

References

Contra dance callers
Square dance
Living people
Year of birth missing (living people)